Glen Acres may refer to:

 Glen Acres, New Mexico, USA
 Glen Acres, Washington, USA